The Dutch leaf-toed gecko (Phyllodactylus martini) is a species of lizard in the family Phyllodactylidae. The species is endemic to the Caribbean.

Etymology
The specific name, martini, is in honor of German geologist Johann Karl Ludwig Martin.

Geographic range
P. martini is found on Aruba, Bonaire, Curaçao, many of the Leeward Islands, and Puerto Rico.

Reproduction
P. martini is oviparous.

References

Further reading
Lidth de Jeude TW (1887). "On a collection of Reptiles and Fishes from the West-Indies". Notes from the Leyden Museum 9: 129–139. (Phyllodactylus martini, new species, pp. 130-131 + Plate II, figures 2 & 3).

Phyllodactylus
Reptiles described in 1887